"HeartBreaker" is the debut single released by the group Teriyaki Boyz and is included within the group's debut album, Beef or Chicken. The single was only released in the U.K. market. The song was produced by the electronic duo Daft Punk and contains a sample of the duo's own song, "Human After All".

Music video
The music video for "HeartBreaker" parodies old sci-fi films, as it commences with a low-budget flying saucer hovering through the air and abducting a cow. The scene then cuts to inside the saucer, where the Teriyaki Boyz materialize and begin performing, with Nigo in the center on the turntable. Throughout the song, each of the Teriyaki Boyz are introduced one by one using caption for their individual verses and don a variety of Bape outfits. As they perform, random objects appear within the room, including a bottle of champagne, a plastic chicken, the aforementioned cow, and car and young woman, both wearing Bape-style camouflage. The video also parodies rockabilly music, having certain scenes feature the group playing and swinging to guitars while stereotypically dressed in matching suits and dark sunglasses. The music video concludes with the flying saucer lifting off and disappearing into the night sky.

Track listing
UK CD single
 "HeartBreaker" (Radio Edit) – 3:58
 "HeartBreaker" (Album Version) – 4:16
 "HeartBreaker" (Instrumental) – 6:42
 "HeartBreaker" (Music Video) – 4:16

Hip hop songs
2006 songs
2006 debut singles
Songs written by Verbal (rapper)
Songs written by Wise (composer)